Ruocco is a surname. Notable people with the surname include:
 Carla Ruocco (born 1973), Italian politician
Frank J. Ruocco, director of National Photographic Interpretation Center
 Joanna Ruocco, American author
 Joseph John Ruocco (1922–1980), American Roman Catholic bishop
 Lisa Ruocco, married to All Time Low lead singer Alex Gaskarth
 Mike Ruocco, American musician
 Ryan Ruocco (born 1986), American television and radio sportscaster
  (1920–1944)

Italian-language surnames